In continuum mechanics, the Cauchy stress tensor , true stress tensor, or simply called the stress tensor is a second order tensor named after Augustin-Louis Cauchy.  The tensor consists of nine components  that completely define the state of stress at a point inside a material in the deformed state, placement, or configuration. The tensor relates a unit-length direction vector e to the traction vector T(e) across an imaginary surface perpendicular to e:

or,

The SI units of both stress tensor and traction vector are N/m2, corresponding to the stress scalar. The unit vector is dimensionless.

The Cauchy stress tensor obeys the tensor transformation law under a change in the system of coordinates. A graphical representation of this transformation law is the Mohr's circle for stress.

The Cauchy stress tensor is used for stress analysis of material bodies experiencing small deformations: It is a central concept in the linear theory of elasticity. For large deformations, also called finite deformations, other measures of stress are required, such as the Piola–Kirchhoff stress tensor, the Biot stress tensor, and the Kirchhoff stress tensor.

According to the principle of conservation of linear momentum, if the continuum body is in static equilibrium it can be demonstrated that the components of the Cauchy stress tensor in every material point in the body satisfy the equilibrium equations (Cauchy's equations of motion for zero acceleration). At the same time, according to the principle of conservation of angular momentum, equilibrium requires that the summation of moments with respect to an arbitrary point is zero, which leads to the conclusion that the stress tensor is symmetric, thus having only six independent stress components, instead of the original nine. However, in the presence of couple-stresses, i.e. moments per unit volume, the stress tensor is non-symmetric. This also is the case when the Knudsen number is close to one, or the continuum is a non-Newtonian fluid, which can lead to rotationally non-invariant fluids, such as polymers.

There are certain invariants associated with the stress tensor, whose values do not depend upon the coordinate system chosen, or the area element upon which the stress tensor operates. These are the three eigenvalues of the stress tensor, which are called the principal stresses.

Euler–Cauchy stress principle – stress vector 

The Euler–Cauchy stress principle states that upon any surface (real or imaginary) that divides the body, the action of one part of the body on the other is equivalent (equipollent) to the system of distributed forces and couples on the surface dividing the body, and it is represented by a field , called the traction vector, defined on the surface  and assumed to depend continuously on the surface's unit vector .

To formulate the Euler–Cauchy stress principle, consider an imaginary surface  passing through an internal material point  dividing the continuous body into two segments, as seen in Figure 2.1a or 2.1b (one may use either the cutting plane diagram or the diagram with the arbitrary volume inside the continuum enclosed by the surface ).

Following the classical dynamics of Newton and Euler, the motion of a material body is produced by the action of externally applied forces which are assumed to be of two kinds: surface forces  and body forces . Thus, the total force  applied to a body or to a portion of the body can be expressed as:

Only surface forces will be discussed in this article as they are relevant to the Cauchy stress tensor.

When the body is subjected to external surface forces or contact forces , following Euler's equations of motion, internal contact forces and moments are transmitted from point to point in the body, and from one segment to the other through the dividing surface ,  due to the mechanical contact of one portion of the continuum onto the other (Figure 2.1a and 2.1b). On an element of area  containing , with normal vector , the force distribution is equipollent to a contact force  exerted at point P and surface moment . In particular, the contact force is given by

where  is the mean surface traction.

Cauchy's stress principle asserts that as  becomes very small and tends to zero the ratio  becomes  and the couple stress vector  vanishes. In specific fields of continuum mechanics the couple stress is assumed not to vanish; however, classical branches of continuum mechanics address non-polar materials which do not consider couple stresses and body moments.

This equation means that the stress vector depends on its location in the body and the orientation of the plane on which it is acting.

This implies that the balancing action of internal contact forces generates a contact force density or Cauchy traction field   that represents a distribution of internal contact forces throughout the volume of the body in a particular configuration of the body at a given time . It is not a vector field because it depends not only on the position  of a particular material point, but also on the local orientation of the surface element as defined by its normal vector .

 one normal to the plane, called normal stress

where  is the normal component of the force  to the differential area 

 and the other parallel to this plane, called the shear stress

where  is the tangential component of the force  to the differential surface area . The shear stress can be further decomposed into two mutually perpendicular vectors.

Cauchy's postulate
This means that the stress vector is a function of the normal vector  only, and is not influenced by the curvature of the internal surfaces.

Cauchy's fundamental lemma
A consequence of Cauchy's postulate is Cauchy's Fundamental Lemma, also called the Cauchy reciprocal theorem, which states that the stress vectors acting on opposite sides of the same surface are equal in magnitude and opposite in direction. Cauchy's fundamental lemma is equivalent to Newton's third law of motion of action and reaction, and is expressed as

Cauchy's stress theorem—stress tensor
The state of stress at a point in the body is then defined by all the stress vectors T(n) associated with all planes (infinite in number) that pass through that point. However, according to Cauchy's fundamental theorem, also called Cauchy's stress theorem, merely by knowing the stress vectors on three mutually perpendicular planes, the stress vector on any other plane passing through that point can be found through coordinate transformation equations.

Cauchy's stress theorem states that there exists a second-order tensor field σ(x, t), called the Cauchy stress tensor, independent of n, such that T is a linear function of n:

This equation implies that the stress vector T(n) at any point P in a continuum associated with a plane with normal unit vector n can be expressed as a function of the stress vectors on the planes perpendicular to the coordinate axes, i.e. in terms of the components σij of the stress tensor σ.

To prove this expression, consider a tetrahedron with three faces oriented in the coordinate planes, and with an infinitesimal area dA oriented in an arbitrary direction specified by a normal unit vector n (Figure 2.2). The tetrahedron is formed by slicing the infinitesimal element along an arbitrary plane with unit normal n. The stress vector on this plane is denoted by T(n). The stress vectors acting on the faces of the tetrahedron are denoted as T(e1), T(e2), and T(e3), and are by definition the components σij of the stress tensor σ. This tetrahedron is sometimes called the Cauchy tetrahedron. The equilibrium of forces, i.e. Euler's first law of motion (Newton's second law of motion), gives:

where the right-hand-side represents the product of the mass enclosed by the tetrahedron and its acceleration: ρ is the density, a is the acceleration, and h is the height of the tetrahedron, considering the plane n as the base. The area of the faces of the tetrahedron perpendicular to the axes can be found by projecting dA into each face (using the dot product):

and then substituting into the equation to cancel out dA:

To consider the limiting case as the tetrahedron shrinks to a point, h must go to 0 (intuitively, the plane n is translated along n toward O). As a result, the right-hand-side of the equation approaches 0, so

Assuming a material element (Figure 2.3) with planes perpendicular to the coordinate axes of a Cartesian coordinate system, the stress vectors associated with each of the element planes, i.e. T(e1), T(e2), and T(e3) can be decomposed into a normal component and two shear components, i.e. components in the direction of the three coordinate axes. For the particular case of a surface with normal unit vector oriented in the direction of the x1-axis, denote the normal stress by σ11, and the two shear stresses as σ12 and σ13:

In index notation this is

The nine components σij of the stress vectors are the components of a second-order Cartesian tensor called the Cauchy stress tensor, which can be used to completely define the state of stress at a point and is given by

where σ11, σ22, and σ33 are normal stresses, and σ12, σ13, σ21, σ23, σ31, and σ32 are shear stresses. The first index i indicates that the stress acts on a plane normal to the Xi -axis, and the second index j denotes the direction in which the stress acts (For example, σ12 implies that the stress is acting on the plane that is normal to the 1st axis i.e.;X1  and acts along the 2nd axis i.e.;X2). A stress component is positive if it acts in the positive direction of the coordinate axes, and if the plane where it acts has an outward normal vector pointing in the positive coordinate direction.

Thus, using the components of the stress tensor

or, equivalently,

Alternatively, in matrix form we have

The Voigt notation representation of the Cauchy stress tensor takes advantage of the symmetry of the stress tensor to express the stress as a six-dimensional vector of the form:

The Voigt notation is used extensively in representing stress–strain relations in solid mechanics and for computational efficiency in numerical structural mechanics software.

Transformation rule of the stress tensor
It can be shown that the stress tensor is a contravariant second order tensor, which is a statement of how it transforms under a change of the coordinate system. From an xi-system to an  xi' -system, the components σij in the initial system are transformed into the components σij'  in the new system according to the tensor transformation rule (Figure 2.4):

where A is a rotation matrix with components aij. In matrix form this is

Expanding the matrix operation, and simplifying terms using the symmetry of the stress tensor, gives

The Mohr circle for stress is a graphical representation of this transformation of stresses.

Normal and shear stresses
The magnitude of the normal stress component σn of any stress vector T(n) acting on an arbitrary plane with normal unit vector n at a given point, in terms of the components σij of the stress tensor σ, is the dot product of the stress vector and the normal unit vector:

The magnitude of the shear stress component τn, acting orthogonal to the vector n, can then be found using the Pythagorean theorem:

where

Balance laws – Cauchy's equations of motion

Cauchy's first law of motion
According to the principle of conservation of linear momentum, if the continuum body is in static equilibrium it can be demonstrated that the components of the Cauchy stress tensor in every material point in the body satisfy the equilibrium equations:
,
where  following Einstein notations.

For example, for a hydrostatic fluid in equilibrium conditions, the stress tensor takes on the form:

{| class="toccolours collapsible collapsed" width="60%" style="text-align:left"
!Derivation of equilibrium equations
|-
Thus, if the body is in equilibrium the resultant force acting on the volume is zero, thus:

Using the Gauss's divergence theorem to convert a surface integral to a volume integral gives

For an arbitrary volume the integral vanishes, and we have the equilibrium equations

|}

Cauchy's second law of motion
According to the principle of conservation of angular momentum, equilibrium requires that the summation of moments with respect to an arbitrary point is zero, which leads to the conclusion that the stress tensor is symmetric, thus having only six independent stress components, instead of the original nine:

{| class="toccolours collapsible collapsed" width="60%" style="text-align:left"
!Derivation of symmetry of the stress tensor
|-
| Summing moments about point O (Figure 4) the resultant moment is zero as the body is in equilibrium. Thus,

where  is the position vector and is expressed as

Knowing that  and using Gauss's divergence theorem to change from a surface integral to a volume integral, we have

The second integral is zero as it contains the equilibrium equations. This leaves the first integral, where , therefore

For an arbitrary volume V, we then have

which is satisfied at every point within the body. Expanding this equation we have

or in general

This proves that the stress tensor is symmetric
|}

However, in the presence of couple-stresses, i.e. moments per unit volume, the stress tensor is non-symmetric. This also is the case when the Knudsen number is close to one, or the continuum is a non-Newtonian fluid, which can lead to rotationally non-invariant fluids, such as polymers.

Principal stresses and stress invariants

At every point in a stressed body there are at least three planes, called principal planes, with normal vectors , called principal directions, where the corresponding stress vector is perpendicular to the plane, i.e., parallel or in the same direction as the normal vector , and where there are no normal shear stresses . The three stresses normal to these principal planes are called principal stresses.

The components  of the stress tensor depend on the orientation of the coordinate system at the point under consideration. However, the stress tensor itself is a physical quantity and as such, it is independent of the coordinate system chosen to represent it. There are certain invariants associated with every tensor which are also independent of the coordinate system. For example, a vector is a simple tensor of rank one. In three dimensions, it has three components. The value of these components will depend on the coordinate system chosen to represent the vector, but the magnitude of the vector is a physical quantity (a scalar) and is independent of the Cartesian coordinate system chosen to represent the vector (so long as it is normal). Similarly, every second rank tensor (such as the stress and the strain tensors) has three independent invariant quantities associated with it. One set of such invariants are the principal stresses of the stress tensor, which are just the eigenvalues of the stress tensor. Their direction vectors are the principal directions or eigenvectors.

A stress vector parallel to the normal unit vector  is given by:

where  is a constant of proportionality, and in this particular case corresponds to the magnitudes  of the normal stress vectors or principal stresses.

This is a homogeneous system, i.e. equal to zero, of three linear equations where  are the unknowns. Thus,

Expanding the determinant leads to the characteristic equation

where

The characteristic equation has three real roots , i.e. not imaginary due to the symmetry of the stress tensor. The eigenvalues are the roots of the characteristic polynomial. The principal stresses are unique for a given stress tensor.

These solutions are the principal directions or eigenvectors defining the plane where the principal stresses act. The principal stresses and principal directions characterize the stress at a point and are independent of the orientation.

A coordinate system with axes oriented to the principal directions implies that the normal stresses are the principal stresses and the stress tensor is represented by a diagonal matrix:

The first and third invariant are the trace and determinant respectively, of the stress tensor. Thus,

Because of its simplicity, the principal coordinate system is often useful when considering the state of the elastic medium at a particular point. Principal stresses are often expressed in the following equation for evaluating stresses in the x and y directions or axial and bending stresses on a part. The principal normal stresses can then be used to calculate the von Mises stress and ultimately the safety factor and margin of safety.

Using just the part of the equation under the square root is equal to the maximum and minimum shear stress for plus and minus. This is shown as:

Maximum and minimum shear stresses
The maximum shear stress or maximum principal shear stress is equal to one-half the difference between the largest and smallest principal stresses, and acts on the plane that bisects the angle between the directions of the largest and smallest principal stresses, i.e. the plane of the maximum shear stress is oriented  from the principal stress planes. The maximum shear stress is expressed as

 

Assuming  then

 

When the stress tensor is non zero the normal stress component acting on the plane for the maximum shear stress is non-zero and it is equal to

 

{| class="toccolours collapsible collapsed" width="60%" style="text-align:left"
!Derivation of the maximum and minimum shear stresses
|-
|The normal stress can be written in terms of principal stresses  as

Knowing that , the shear stress in terms of principal stresses components is expressed as

The maximum shear stress at a point in a continuum body is determined by maximizing  subject to the condition that

This is a constrained maximization problem, which can be solved using the Lagrangian multiplier technique to convert the problem into an unconstrained optimization problem.

The Lagrangian function for this problem can be written as

where  is the Lagrangian multiplier (which is different from the  use to denote eigenvalues).

The extreme values of these functions are

thence

Adding these three equations we get

this result can be substituted into each of the first three equations to obtain

Doing the same for the other two equations we have

A first approach to solve these last three equations is to consider the trivial solution . However, this option does not fulfill the constraint .

The other two possible values for  can be obtained similarly by assuming

 and 
 and 

Thus, one set of solutions for these four equations is:

Thus we have

Knowing that for 

and

we have

and solving for  we have

Then solving for  we have

and

The other two possible values for  can be obtained similarly by assuming

 and 
 and 

Therefore, assuming , the maximum shear stress is expressed by

and it can be stated as being equal to one-half the difference between the largest and smallest principal stresses, acting on the plane that bisects the angle between the directions of the largest and smallest principal stresses.
|}

Stress deviator tensor
The stress tensor  can be expressed as the sum of two other stress tensors:
 a mean hydrostatic stress tensor or volumetric stress tensor or mean normal stress tensor, which tends to change the volume of the stressed body; and
 a deviatoric component called the stress deviator tensor, which tends to distort it.
So

where  is the mean stress given by

Pressure is generally defined as negative one-third the trace of the stress tensor minus any stress the divergence of the velocity contributes with, i.e.

The deviatoric stress tensor can be obtained by subtracting the hydrostatic stress tensor from the Cauchy stress tensor:

Invariants of the stress deviator tensor
As it is a second order tensor, the stress deviator tensor also has a set of invariants, which can be obtained using the same procedure used to calculate the invariants of the stress tensor. It can be shown that the principal directions of the stress deviator tensor  are the same as the principal directions of the stress tensor . Thus, the characteristic equation is

Their values are the same (invariant) regardless of the orientation of the coordinate system chosen. Thus,

Because , the stress deviator tensor is in a state of pure shear.

A quantity called the equivalent stress or von Mises stress is commonly used in solid mechanics. The equivalent stress is defined as

Octahedral stresses

Considering the principal directions as the coordinate axes, a plane whose normal vector makes equal angles with each of the principal axes (i.e. having direction cosines equal to ) is called an octahedral plane. There are a total of eight octahedral planes (Figure 6). The normal and shear components of the stress tensor on these planes are called octahedral normal stress  and octahedral shear stress , respectively. Octahedral plane passing through the origin is known as the π-plane (π not to be confused with mean stress denoted by π in above section) . On the π-plane, .

Knowing that the stress tensor of point O (Figure 6) in the principal axes is

the stress vector on an octahedral plane is then given by:

The normal component of the stress vector at point O associated with the octahedral plane is

which is the mean normal stress or hydrostatic stress. This value is the same in all eight octahedral planes.
The shear stress on the octahedral plane is then

See also 
 Critical plane analysis

References 

Tensor physical quantities
Solid mechanics
Continuum mechanics
Structural analysis